Albulena Balaj-Halimaj is an Kosovo-Albanian politician and NISMA member.

Career
Balaj-Halimaj was named on 3 June 2020 Avdullah Hoti's cabinet as one of the deputy prime ministers. She remained in that position until 22 March 2021.

References

Kosovo Albanians
Living people
Deputy Prime Ministers of Kosovo
Government ministers of Kosovo
Year of birth missing (living people)
21st-century women politicians